The Taos Blizzard were a professional baseball team based in Taos, New Mexico. The team was a member of the Pecos League, an independent baseball league which is not affiliated with Major or Minor League Baseball. The team played its home games at The Tundra at Taos and began operations for the 2013 season. The team ceased operations following the 2014 season.

Notable alumni

 Eric Yardley (2013)

References

External links
 Taos Blizzard Homepage

Pecos League teams
Professional baseball teams in New Mexico
Baseball teams established in 2013
2013 establishments in New Mexico
2014 disestablishments in New Mexico
Defunct independent baseball league teams
Defunct baseball teams in New Mexico
Baseball teams disestablished in 2014